PCPP can refer to:

PC PowerPlay, Australia's only dedicated PC games magazine.
PCPartPicker, PC-building list creator and community.
Polychloro phenoxy phenol
para-Chlorophenylpiperazine